Nikolai Markarov (March 18, 1933, Baku – June 28, 2008, Moscow) Soviet Russian artist and sculptor.

A member of the USSR Union of Artists (1975)

Biography and professional activity 
In 1956 Nikolai Markarov graduated from the Baku Art School. Then he enrolled and graduated from the Moscow State Academic Art Institute named after V.I. Surikov, being qualified as a sculptor - artist and continued to live and work in Moscow.

From 1963 to 1965 Nikolai worked as a sculptor in a sculptural production factory of RSFSR. In 1965 Nikolai Markarov was invited to Moscow Architectural Institute (State Academy) – MarchI first as a teacher at the Department of the figure, and then as a sculptor, where he was working for over 13 years.

In 1975 N. Markarov was admitted to the USSR Union of Artists on the recommendation of members of the Union of artists - sculptors A. Stemkovsky, D. Shakhovsky and N. Lavinsky, who believed that N. Markarov entered the list of the thirty best sculptors of the USSR.

Besides the main work of the sculptor -artist N. Markarov illustrated books, wrote poetry and prose.

Lev Feodorovich Dyakonitsyn, Academician of the Russian Academy of Arts, the European Academy of Arts and Sciences, the French Academy of Sciences and Arts, the artist and art critic, at the opening ceremony of N. Markarov's exhibition at the Art Gallery Dresden in autumn 2013 said:

Nikolai Markarov managed to find in his work such a hand movement, a line that would talk about the nature of a man and of the divinity of a man. We are captivated by so soft, friendly, love game of the artist with paper space. It's a very rare, just exceptional phenomenon. Nowadays such masters are few. I think that he will be recalled very often. His wealth of nature is not confined only to graphics. Nikolai Markarov was also a theater artist and a poet, and an illustrator of many books, including his own ones. He was gifted by nature and did not know restraints in his imagination, and this fantasy is a kind of discovery of the world for us. The main theme of Nikolai Markarov is the image of beauty, the image of a woman, his companion or just the one met by his enamored eye, a caught character, and he immediately embodies them with simple means. Nikolai Markarov seems to catch a glimpse of a face in a crowd; he grabs beautiful faces and wants to remember them, as found little treasures. Sometimes these images are pinched out, the line is so solid, being the formula of the character, and the other vice versa are very lazy, very naughty. It is this combination of confidence and freedom that is particularly interesting, because the artist was coming from one method to another and was not afraid to experiment. Nikolai Markarov has left wonderful heritage for us. The artist remains alive for us, a living master, who tells us that we need to endure routine and everyday life philosophically patiently and even heroically and try to rise above it. Nikolai Markarov entered a cohort of selected artists, who knew how and what to say.

Group exhibitions 
 1946 - The children's exhibition of sculpture, I prize for sculpture "The last hours of Taras Bulba’s life on the fire", Baku
 1961 – All-Union Art Exhibition, Moscow
 1962 - Graphics of Transcaucasia, Moscow
 1967 - All-Union Exhibition of small form sculptures, Moscow
 1967 - All-Union Exhibition of young graphic artists, Moscow
 1974 - All-Union Exhibition of sculptors, Moscow
 1980 - The Moscow exhibition of sculptors, Moscow
 1985 - All-Union Exhibition of sculptors, Moscow
 1990 - Exhibition of Moscow sculptors, Moscow
 1995 - Exhibition of Moscow sculptors in the open air, Moscow
 1997 - Exhibition of Moscow sculptors, House of Artists, Moscow
 2000 - Exhibition "Gifts of Moscow Artists ", Moscow
 2004 - Regional Art Gallery, Vologda
 2009 - Exhibition "Black on white ", Art Museum, Yaroslavl
 2013 - Nadja Brykina's Gallery, Zurich
 2013 - Exhibition "The Triumph of Venus. Nude in Art ", Art Museum, Yaroslavl

There were also exhibitions in Moscow in libraries named after Nekrasov, Bogolyubov, the Club of railwaymen, publishing house of the magazine "Working Woman", etc.

Personal exhibitions 
 2009 - The Institute of Heritage named after Likhachev, Moscow
 2010 - The gallery of Higher Artistic and Technical Workshops, Moscow Institute of Architecture, Moscow
 2011 - Picture gallery, Podolsk
 2012 - Nadja Brykina's Gallery, Moscow
 2013 - Art Gallery “Dresden”, Gostinny Dvor, Moscow
 2013 Art Gallery “Dresden”, International multifunctional Center of Arts, Moscow

Podolsk TV presented the exhibition of Nikolai Markarov's works on June 15, 2011

Collection of his works in museums 
 The State Russian Museum, the graphics department, St. Petersburg
 State History Museum, St. Petersburg
 Art Museum, Yaroslavl
 Regional Art Gallery, Vologda
 Art Gallery, Podolsk
  Museum of the Moscow Architectural Institute, Moscow
 Museum of the Patriotic War on Poklonnaya Hill, Moscow
 Nadja Brykina's Gallery, Zurich (Switzerland)
 Art Gallery “Dresden”, Moscow

Literary activity 
"Anthology of Russian free verse". M., Publisher Prometheus, 1991. 348 pp., 
"Origins", almanac. M., Publisher RIF «ROY ", 2006. 321 pp., 
N. Markarov. Selected works in 6 volumes. M., Publisher magazine Youth, 2010,

Book graphics 
Prokofiev S.L., Sapgir G.V., Grishin V.G. Ruddy cheeks, M., Physical Education and Sport, 1987, 
Kharazyan E.G. TAY - CI ancient Chinese Gymnastics, Tver Regional Council VDFSO union, order number 498
Kharazyan E.G. Tips of  the three doctors, M., RIF " ROY ", 2005, 
Rezina U., Stories, M., 2006,

Publications about Markarov 
 Roy G.S., Almanac "Origins" 2006
 Academician (sculptor) Burganov A.N., Kazantsev A., "Bogolyubov magazine” No.7, July 2008
 G. Avetisyan, magazine "Armenian Church " Russian Diocese of the Armenian Apostolic Church (Moscow) No.4, April 2008
 Pushchin V., the newspaper " The Coach series "
 Gabrieljan N. "Nine lines of Nikolai Markarov" newspaper " Interlocutor of Armenia" No.10, October 2013

Catalogues 
 Nikolai Markarov. Overheard song. Nadja Brykina's Gallery, 2012. 
 Black & White Russian and European Graphics of the 20th Century. Yaroslavl Art Museum. Gallery 2.36, 2009. 
 Nikolai Markarov, sculptures, drawings, poems. Teachers of MARCHI, Moscow Architectural Institute. Gallery of Higher Artistic and Technical Workshops, 2010

Souvenirs of Yaroslavl Art Museum 
N. Markarov. Nine lines, 1963, souvenir plate, porcelain, diameter 12 cm, IC Zhukov "YarDecal", 2009
N. Markarov. In Banja (bath), 1960, souvenir plate, porcelain, diameter 12 cm, IC Zhukov "YarDecal", 2009
N. Markarov. Nine lines, 1963, souvenir plate, porcelain, diameter 12 cm, IC Zhukov "YarDecal", 2013
N. Markarov. In Banja (bath), 1960, souvenir plate, porcelain, diameter 12 cm, IC Zhukov "YarDecal", 2013

Poetry 
  ***
The watch is implacable:
It will work even when taken off the wrist and set aside.

(V.4, p. 228)

  ***

— Immortality?
We′ve sliced it into centuries and seconds!

(V.4, p. 228)

  ***

Oh Lord, pardon me, could it be true that I do see now what You mean?

(V.4, p. 219)

  ***

I inherit all that has been invented by mankind:
the Paper, the Three Nails, and the Atomic Mushroom.

(V.4, p. 215)

 ABOUT A MIRROR

The sky was the colour of soil,

His hair was colour of soil,

Hands and bare feet were colour of soil,

There went a dirty man

On a dirty land.

And there was in his bosom

A small round mirror without a rim.

And now and then

When it was light for him like a day

He took his glass,

Mapped sweat and dust off

And cleaned until

It became bright,

As bright as the sky.

And the sky was clean in it

Like a glass.

And not looking into it

He put it again in his bosom

And went on going.

 ABOUT AN ARM-CHAIR

I ordered an arm-chair.

But in good time

It wasn't ready.

And when it was ready

The lacquer didn't stick.

When it stopped sticking,

Lost its luster.

And I went to the wood,

Where a stump waited.

All I needed was

To flick the bug off

To seat myself on the stump.

External links 
  Register of professional artists of the Russian Empire, the Soviet Union, Russian Abroad , the Russian Federation and the former Soviet Union republics (18th - 21st centuries).
  ArtRu.info - Persons
  Poems.ru - N.N. Markarov’ s poems
  About N.N. Markarov’s exhibition in Podolsk
  Gogol.ru about N.N. Markarov’s exhibition in the gallery of Higher Artistic and Technical Workshops
  News: Nadja Brykina's Gallery exhibition of N.N. Markarov
  Art Fair Art Paris Art Fair Nadja Brykina Gallery
 Press release of a personal exhibition of N. Markarov in Art Gallery Dresden
  Afisha.ru about exhibition of N.N. Markarov Art Gallery Dresden 
 Арт-релиз.ру Art  reliz.ru  about N. Markarov’s exhibition in Art Gallery Dresden
 Art booth at the Art Museum of Yaroslavl.  Souvenirs for the exhibition Black on White
  The content of the 7th issue of  Journal of Bogolyubov
  Poster of Bogolyubov library, literary and musical composition of poetry and prose of Nikolai Markarov

1933 births
Artists from Baku
2008 deaths
Russian male sculptors
Soviet sculptors
20th-century sculptors
Academic staff of Moscow Architectural Institute